Candelariella coralliza is a species of fungus belonging to the family Candelariaceae.

Synonym:
 Lecanora coralliza Nyl., 1875 (= basionym)

References

coralliza
Lichen species
Taxa named by William Nylander (botanist)
Lichens described in 1875